The 2012 Mid-Ohio Sports Car Challenge was a multi-class sports car and GT motor race held at the Mid-Ohio Sports Car Course in Ohio, United States on August 4, 2012. It was the sixth round of the 2012 American Le Mans Series season and the 41st race in the combined history of sportscar races associated with the Mid-Ohio Sports Car Challenge. The race was held over a two-hour-and-45-minute time period, during which 123 laps of the 3.6 kilometre circuit were completed for a race distance of 447 kilometres.

The race was won by the Muscle Milk Pickett Racing team. German drivers Lucas Luhr and Klaus Graf driving a HPD ARX-03a Honda sports car won by over a lap from their season long P1 class rivals, the Dyson Racing Team run Lola B12/60 sports car. It was the fifth consecutive victory for Luhr and Graf. It was Luhr third outright win at Mid-Ohio and Graf's second. The second Dyson Racing Team Lola-Mazda was in third place near the end of the race when the gearbox failed.

Level 5 Motorsports took their fifth win of the season taking a seven second win in their HPD ARX-03b over their season long rivals, the Conquest Endurance team Morgan LMP2. It was Scott Tucker's fifth win of the season and Christophe Bouchut's fourth win.

Fifth was the second Level 5 Motorsports HPD-Honda ahead of the Prototype Challenge class winners, the PR1/Mathiasan Motorsports pair of Rudy Junco and Marino Franchitti in their Oreca FLM09. It was the team's third victory in the Prototype Challenge class adding to wins at Road America and Road Atlanta in 2011.

Eleventh outright was the GT class winners, Corvette Racing pair of Oliver Gavin and Tommy Milner in their Chevrolet Corvette. Gavin had to endure twenty minutes of pressure from Jörg Bergmeister in the Flying Lizard Motorsports. The margin of victory was just 0.2 seconds.

The GT Challenge class winners, Tim Pappas and Jeroen Bleekemolen, claimed JDX Racing's first win of the year. It was Bleekemolen's second win after the year after winning in Monterey in May with TRG. TRG was second in class with new driver Al Carter and Spencer Pumpelly.

29 of the 32 entries were running at races conclusion.

Race

Race result
Class winners in bold.  Cars failing to complete 70% of their class winner's distance are marked as Not Classified (NC).

References

Mid-Ohio
Sports Car Challenge of Mid-Ohio
Mid-Ohio Sports Car Challenge